is a Japanese former sprinter who competed in the 1972 Summer Olympics.

References

1950 births
Living people
Japanese male sprinters
Olympic male sprinters
Olympic athletes of Japan
Athletes (track and field) at the 1972 Summer Olympics
Asian Games medalists in athletics (track and field)
Athletes (track and field) at the 1970 Asian Games
Athletes (track and field) at the 1974 Asian Games
Asian Games gold medalists for Japan
Asian Games bronze medalists for Japan
Medalists at the 1970 Asian Games
Medalists at the 1974 Asian Games
Japan Championships in Athletics winners
20th-century Japanese people